Frederico Pedreira (born 1983) is a Portuguese writer. He studied in Portugal and the UK, where he pursued a master’s degree at Royal Holloway, University of London. He completed a PhD in literary theory at the University of Lisbon; the book based on his dissertation won the 2016 INCM/Vasco Graça Moura Prize for best essay in the humanities. Pedreira has worked in a range of professions, e.g. journalist, translator and bookseller. He has also lived in other European countries such as Italy and France. 

As a writer, he has published around 10 books, including six collections of poetry, two novels, a book of short stories and a collection of essays. In 2021, he won the EU Prize for Literature for his book A LIÇÃO DO SONÂMBULO (The Sleepwalker Lesson). As a translator, he has translated the works of Yeats, Louise Glück, GK Chesterton, Orwell, and novels by Dickens, Swift, H. G. Wells, Hardy, John Banville and Virginia Woolf.

References

Portuguese writers
1983 births
Living people